Tee Lake is an unincorporated community in LaPorte County, Indiana, in the United States.

It took its name from the body of water.

References

Unincorporated communities in LaPorte County, Indiana
Unincorporated communities in Indiana